My Little Pony: Rainbow Roadtrip is a 2019 one-hour television special based on the animated television series My Little Pony: Friendship Is Magic. Unlike Friendship Is Magic, it was not produced by DHX Studios Vancouver, instead by Boulder Media Limited in Ireland, and featured the same redesigned art style that was used in the 2017 movie.

The special aired on Discovery Family on June 29, 2019.

Plot 

Rainbow Dash receives an invitation to be the guest of honor at the Rainbow Festival in the town of Hope Hollow. She and her friends set out by balloon, but collide with a rainbow billboard on the edge of Hope Hollow. The billboard and balloon are damaged, but the ponies are unhurt. Petunia Petals puts them up at the hotel she runs.

The next morning, the six friends find the town and residents totally devoid of color. The mayor, Sunny Skies, takes them on a tour of the town. The Festival events are meager or nonexistent, and the mayor admits apathy has taken hold. Sunny's grandfather had set up the Festival and built a Rainbow Generator to fill the sky with color. When Sunny became mayor, the generator malfunctioned and drained all the color from the town, so Twilight and her friends agree to help him.

The Hoofingtons are bakers whose products suffer because without color, they cannot tell ripe from unripe fruit. Next-door Moody Root is a grower, and once Fluttershy and Pinkie Pie encourage them to start talking, Moody agrees to give the Hoofingtons part of his crop in exchange for some pies. Applejack works with repair pony Torque Wrench to fix the billboard. Rainbow Dash mentors local youngsters Barley and Pickle Barrel in stunt flying, and Rarity collaborates with fashion designer Kerfuffle on designs for the Festival. As Twilight and her friends encourage the ponies, small spots of color begin to manifest around town.

Twilight investigates how to bring color back. Torque repairs the generator, but it still fails to reverse the color loss. Twilight realizes that the generator was not at fault and the fading of the town's hopeful spirit had caused the colors to start disappearing even before the generator broke down. By working to revive the Festival, she and her friends have been bringing back that hope.

The Festival begins anew, with the Hoofington's pies, Kerfuffle's accessories, and Rainbow Dash leading Barley and Pickle in an airshow. In front of a cheering crowd, Petunia accepts Sunny's proposal of marriage. Community spirit and color return to Hope Hollow, and Twilight and her friends return to Ponyville with the town's gratitude.

Voice cast 

 Tara Strong as Twilight Sparkle
 Rebecca Shoichet as Twilight Sparkle (singing voice)
 Ashleigh Ball as Rainbow Dash and Applejack
 Andrea Libman as Pinkie Pie and Fluttershy
 Shannon Chan-Kent as Pinkie Pie (singing voice)
 Tabitha St. Germain as Rarity
 Kazumi Evans as Rarity (singing voice)
 Cathy Weseluck as Spike
 Ian Hanlin as Mayor Sunny Skies
 Kelly Metzger as Petunia Petals
 Rhona Rhees as Torque Wrench
 Terry Klassen as Moody Root
 Racquel Belmonte as Kerfuffle
 Michael Daingerfield as Mr. Hoofington
 Veena Sood as Mrs. Hoofington
 Sabrina Pitre as Barley Barrel
 David A. Kaye as Pickle Barrel

Merchandise 
A toyline collection pack tie-in, titled "Rainbow Tail Surprise", was announced at the 2019 Toy Fair in New York. This pack was made available in the third quarter of 2019.

Multiple books based on the special was be released, including a "Passport to Reading" Level 2 My Little Pony: Road Trip Event reader on June 25, 2019. In the United Kingdom, My Little Pony Annual 2020 is set for an August 8 release and My Little Pony: Essential Handbook: A Magical Guide for Everypony on September 5.

Release 
Rainbow Roadtrip received a private screening at the Odeon Cinema theater on May 23, 2019 and premiered on June 29, 2019 on Discovery Family. A release on Netflix was also announced but never occurred.

References

External links 
 

My Little Pony: Friendship Is Magic
2019 television specials
2010s animated television specials